Muradjan Khalmuratov (born 11 June 1982) is a Uzbekistani road bicycle racer. He competed at the 2012 Summer Olympics in the Men's road race, but failed to finish. Khalmuratov has won a record number of 11 Uzbekistan National Time Trial Championships.

Major results
Source:

2004
 6th Overall Tour de Korea
 9th Time trial, Asian Road Championships
2006
 7th Trofeo Franco Balestra
 9th Trofeo Alcide Degasperi
2007
 9th Time trial, UCI B World Championships
2011
 National Road Championships
1st  Time trial
5th Road race
 1st Overall Tour of China
 Asian Road Championships
2nd  Road race
5th Time trial
 7th Overall Jelajah Malaysia
2012
 National Road Championships
1st  Time trial
4th Road race
 2nd Overall Princess Maha Chakri Sirindhon's Cup Tour of Thailand
1st Stage 1
 Asian Road Championships
4th Time trial
6th Road race
 5th Overall Tour de Brunei
 5th Overall Tour of Fuzhou
2013
 Asian Road Championships
1st  Time trial
1st  Road race
 National Road Championships
1st  Time trial
1st  Road race
 7th Overall Tour of Iran
2014
 1st  Time trial, National Road Championships
 7th Time trial, Asian Road Championships
 9th Overall Tour of Thailand
2015
 National Road Championships
1st  Time trial
4th Road race
2016
 National Road Championships
1st  Time trial
2nd Road race
2017
 National Road Championships
1st  Time trial
2nd Road race
 Asian Road Championships
5th Time trial
10th Road race
2018
 1st  Time trial, National Road Championships
 2nd Time trial, Asian Games
2019
 National Road Championships
1st  Time trial
1st  Road race
 Asian Road Championships
9th Road race
10th Time trial
2020
 National Road Championships
1st  Time trial
1st  Road race
2021
 1st  Time trial, National Road Championships
 4th Grand Prix Alanya
 6th Grand Prix Velo Alanya
 7th Grand Prix Gündoğmuş
2022
 3rd  Time trial, Asian Road Championships
 6th Grand Prix Kapuzbaşı
 7th Grand Prix Velo Manavgat
 9th Grand Prix Mediterranean
 10th Grand Prix Yahyalı

References

External links
 
 

Uzbekistani male cyclists
Living people
Olympic cyclists of Uzbekistan
Cyclists at the 2012 Summer Olympics
Cyclists at the 2020 Summer Olympics
1982 births
Cyclists at the 2010 Asian Games
Cyclists at the 2014 Asian Games
Cyclists at the 2018 Asian Games
Medalists at the 2018 Asian Games
Asian Games silver medalists for Uzbekistan
Asian Games medalists in cycling
20th-century Uzbekistani people
21st-century Uzbekistani people